Karl Friedrich Hartmann Mayer (22 March 1786, Bischofsheim – 25 February 1870, Tübingen) was a German jurist and poet of the Swabian school of poets, the circle of Justinus Kerner and the Serach poets' circle under count Alexander von Württemberg (1801–1844). His younger brother Louis Mayer was a landscape painter.

1786 births
1870 deaths
People from Rhein-Neckar-Kreis
German poets
German male poets
German-language poets
Writers from Baden-Württemberg